Paves is a dialect of Western Lombard language spoken in province of Pavia (Lombardy). In Paves, differently from most of Western Lombard dialects, the "z" (ts or dz) is transformed into "s".

In the past, before the influence of Milanese, Pavese was more similar to Emiliano-Romagnolo language. In Lomellina a Piedmontese-influenced dialect is spoken; in the Oltrepò Pavese fully Western Lombard dialects (like that of Bobbio) or Emiliano-Romagnolo-influenced dialects (like that of Broni) are spoken; the southern part of the province of Pavia speaks Ligurian-influenced dialects.

Pavese is the language of I Fiö dla Nebia and Quèi Ad La Barcéla, two popular musical groups.

References 

Western Lombard language